Gherardini is an Italian surname. Notable people with the surname include:

Gherardini family of Montagliari, aristocratic family of Florence
Alessandro Gherardini (1655–1723), Italian painter of Baroque Florence
Jacopo Schettini Gherardini (born 1965), Italian economist
Maurizio Gherardini (b. 1955), Italian sportsman, general manager for the Fenerbahçe Basketball
Lisa Gherardini (1479–1542), woman depicted in the Mona Lisa painting
Melchiorre Gherardini (1607-1668), Italian painter, known as Ceranino
Stefano Gherardini (1695–1755), Italian genre painter
Tommaso Gherardini (1715–1797), Italian painter of late 18th-century Florence

See also
Gherardi
Gherardesca
 Girardin, surname taken by members of the Gherardini family in France

Italian-language surnames
Patronymic surnames
Surnames from given names